The Alliance des professeures et professeurs de Montréal is a professional trade union that represents teachers in the Commission scolaire de Montréal.

The alliance traces its origins to the Alliance catholique des professeurs de Montréal, which was founded in 1919 and received official accreditation in 1944. Before Quebec's education system was restructured from religious to linguistic boards in 1998, the alliance represented teachers in the Montreal Catholic School Commission.

The alliance is part of the Fédération autonome de l'enseignement, founded in 2006.

References

Education in Montreal
Organizations based in Montreal
Trade unions in Quebec

External links
Official website